= Ada Punga =

Ada Punga ادا پنگا
- Location within Pakistan
- Coordinates: 32.49°N 69.61°E
- Country: Pakistan
- Territory: Federally Administered Tribal Areas
- Elevation: 1,957 m (6,421 ft)
- Time zone: UTC+5 (PST)
  - Summer (DST): UTC+6 (PDT)

Ada Punga (Urdu: ادا پنگا) is a town in the Federally Administered Tribal Areas of Pakistan. It is about 216 mi (or 348 km) south-west of Islamabad, the country's capital place.
